Basireddy Palem is a village in Prakasam district of the Indian state of Andhra Pradesh. It is located in Gudluru mandal of Kandukur revenue division.

Politics 

List of Elected Members:
 1957–1962 – Divi Kondaiah Chowdary
 1962–1967 – Nalamothu Chenchurama Naidu
 1967–1972 – Nalamothu Chenchurama Naidu
 1972—1978 – Manugunta Adinarayana Reddy
 1978 – 1983 – Divi Kondaiah Chowdary
 1983 and 1985 – Sri Manugunta Adinarayana Reddy
 1989 and 1994 – Manugunta Maheedhar Reddy
 1994 and 1999 – Dr. Divi Sivaram
 1999 and 2004 – Dr. Divi Siva
 2004 and 2009 – Manugunta Maheedhar Reddy
 2009 and 2014 – Manugunta Maheedhar Reddy (Municipal Minister-2011)
2014-19 -Pothula Ramarao (YSRCP)

References

External links
 https://archive.today/20140901014934/http://panchayatdirectory.gov.in/adminreps/viewGPmapcvills.asp?gpcode=238383&rlbtype=V
 

Villages in Prakasam district